Sara Dane is a 1982 Australian television miniseries about a woman transported from England to Australia for a crime she did not commit.

Original novel
The mini-series was based on the best-selling 1954 novel of the same name by Catherine Gaskin. Gaskin had spent two years researching the book, which was inspired by the true story of Mary Reibey, a woman convict who married an officer while travelling to Australia, went on to become a successful businesswoman in her own right, and whose image has been featured since 1994 on the Australian $20 note.

The novel was Gaskin's most successful, selling over two million copies. Film rights were sold and Gaskin announced in 1955 that a movie version would be made at Elstree Studios the following year, but this did not occur. Neither did another proposed production starring Sylvia Syms.

Production
In 1980 it was announced that the South Australian Film Corporation would make a mini-series of the novel for Network Ten, possibly starring Judy Davis and Sam Neill. Eventually Juliet Jordan was cast. Gaskin later said that Juliet was "not at all what I expected in Sara ... but I'm more than delighted Juliet was cast ... My young Sara was supposed to be a very strong character. You would have had to have been, to have survived and succeeded in the early days of Australia. If anything, the television Sara is even stronger than the novel's leading character in the end."

Soundtrack
A soundtrack was released in 1982 by Cherry Pie.

Charts

References

External links
Sara Dane at AustLit
Sara Dane at IMDb

1980s Australian television miniseries
Network 10 original programming
Television shows set in New South Wales
1982 Australian television series debuts
1982 Australian television series endings
Television shows set in colonial Australia
Television shows based on Australian novels
Historical novels
Novels set in Sydney
Films directed by Rod Hardy